René Hubert (22 July 1885 – 13 October 1954) was a French historian of philosophy and educational theorist.

Hubert was born in Dammartin-en-Serve. He gained his agrégé in philosophy in 1908. He became professor of Morals, Sociology and Philosophy of Science at the Faculty of Letters of the University of Lille in 1923, and in 1936 Rector of the Academy of Poitiers.

He wrote on the eighteenth-century Enlightenment - the Encyclopédie, Jean-Jacques Rousseau and Baron d'Holbach - as well as on educational theory.

Works
 Les Sciences sociales dans l'Encyclopédie. La philosophie de l'histoire et le probleme des origines sociales, 1923
 D'Holbach et ses amis, 1928
 Rousseau et l'Encyclopédie. Essai sur la formation des idées politiques de Rousseau (1742 - 1756), 1928
 Traité de la pédagogie générale, 1946
 Histoire de la pédagogie, 1949

References

External links
 
 René Hubert at the International Dictionary of Intellectual Historians

1885 births
1954 deaths
French historians of philosophy
20th-century French philosophers
Philosophers of education
French male non-fiction writers
20th-century French male writers